Johan Møller Warmedal (28 April 1914 – 19 August 1988) was a Norwegian politician for the Conservative Party.

He was born in Trondenes.

He was elected to the Norwegian Parliament from Vestfold in 1954, and was re-elected on three occasions. He had previously been a deputy representative from 1950–1953.

Warmedal was deputy mayor of Nøtterøy municipality in the period 1947–1948 and rose to the position of mayor in the terms 1948–1951 and 1951–1955.

References

1914 births
1988 deaths
Conservative Party (Norway) politicians
Members of the Storting
20th-century Norwegian politicians